Nigardsbreen is a glacier arm of the large Jostedalsbreen glacier. It is located just west of the Jostedøla river.

In front of the Nigardsbreen is the lake Nigardsbrevatnet where there is a small boat to transport visitors to the glacier. There is also a bus to take visitors to the glacier.

History
During the first half of the 18th century, the glacier expanded due to cold weather. Then during the winters of 1741-1744 were extremely cold. Apples and pears did not ripen during the summer and the bee populations perished. Between 1700 and 1748, the glacier moved forward about  completely covering and crushing the "Nigard" farm (hence the name of the glacier). From 1930 until 1939, the glacier retracted again.

Safety
Nigardbreen has seen several severe accidents involving tourists ignoring the local safety warnings. In July 1986 two people, a Danish woman and her 8-year-old daughter, died when hit by chunks of ice that fell from the glacier. In 1994 a Polish woman was left in critical condition after being hit by falling ice. In 2014 a German couple died as a result of being crushed by ice; their  children standing close by survived physically unharmed. In August 2018 an Austrian man drowned when a wave caused by a huge block of ice swept him into the glacial river.

Media gallery

See also
List of glaciers in Norway

References

External links
 Official site
 Map
 Fylkesmannen Sogn og Fjordane 

Luster, Norway
Glaciers of Vestland